Jimmy Rivière is a 2011 French drama film directed by Teddy Lussi-Modeste.

Plot 
Jimmy Rivière is passionate about Muay Thai. He seeks a possible life where he could reconcile his faith and his love for Sonia, a young Muslim girl, also in love with him. But Jimmy is also a nervous young gypsy in search of ideal and plagued by doubts, who lives in his loosely truck fitted a bed, not far from his family of caravans : his mother and "sister love" married without love. His conversion to Pentecostalism, a very assertive and fundamental branch in Protestantism led him to question himself on his two passions : boxing and Sonia. Indeed, Pentecostals believe that to become a better man, they must renounce to violence and desire. Under pressure from the community, Jimmy applies but is struggling to put in agreement his will and acts. Gina, his boxing coach keeps reminding him that he would fine battles to fight and tries to make him back to his sporting passion.

Cast 

 Guillaume Gouix as Jimmy Rivière
 Béatrice Dalle as Gina
 Hafsia Herzi as Sonia
 Serge Riaboukine as José
 Pamela Flores as Becka
 Jacky Patrac as Ezechiel
 Canaan Marguerite as Mario
 Nadia Desposito as Thérèse
 Kévin Debar as Kevin
 David Ribeiro as Isaac
 Fanny Touron as Nessie
 Abdoulaye Fofana as Alfa Diallo
 Eye Haïdara as Fatim
 Paul Andrei as Rocky
 Djessé Metbach as John
 Marvin Hospice as Nino
 Clément Chevalier-Bousquet as Clément
 Mayli Flores as Cristal
 Marjorie Jalet as Marjorie
 Stéphanie Lussi as Stéphanie
 Jacques Fieschi as The Prefect

Accolades

References

External links 

2011 films
French drama films
Films scored by Robin Coudert
2011 drama films
2010s French films